Shepherd Independent School District is a public school district based in Shepherd, Texas (USA).

In 2009, the school district was rated "academically acceptable" by the Texas Education Agency.

In 2019 the Texas Education Agency announced it would take control of the district, vacating the elected board.

Schools
 Shepherd High (Grades 9-12)
 Shepherd Middle (Grades 6-8)
 Shepherd Intermediate (Grades 3-5)
 Shepherd Primary (Grades PK-2)

References

External links
 Shepherd ISD

School districts in San Jacinto County, Texas